Rendahl's messmate (Echiodon rendahli) is a pearlfish of the family Carapidae, found in the southwest Pacific Ocean around Australia and New Zealand at depths to .  Its length is between .The larvae has a long filament on its head which bears some resemblance to a siphonophore. These fish live within sponges. The specific name honours the Swedish naturalist and artist Hialmar Rendahl who collected the specimens in the Tasman Sea which were used by Gilbert Percy Whitley to describe this species.

References

Carapidae
Marine fish of Southern Australia
Marine fish of New Zealand
Rendahl's messmate